Moses Gate railway station serves the Moses Gate suburb of Farnworth in the Metropolitan Borough of Bolton, Greater Manchester, North West England.

Until the late 1970s, Moses Gate was one of the more important stations on the line between Manchester Victoria and Bolton, with Sunday service and high patronage. But due to clearance of much housing in the area, use has declined (see Strategic Rail Authority figures) although it retains an hourly service (see National Rail Timetable). Moses Gate is the nearest railway station to the village of Little Lever. The station was staffed until the early 1990s, but the station buildings were badly damaged in an arson attack and subsequently demolished.  It is now unmanned and has no ticketing facilities (passengers intending to travel must buy tickets in advance or on the train).  Shelters and timetable posters are located on both platforms; though there are ramps to each platform, the National Rail Enquiries entry for the station states that it is not currently (December 2016) DDA-compliant.

From early May 2015 until the December 2015 timetable change, services from the station were suspended and replaced by buses due to the ongoing modernisation work here (where the platforms have been rebuilt, ahead of planned electrification of the line) and on the route further south at Farnworth Tunnel.  The station reopened on 14 December 2015.

Service

Since the May 2018 timetable change, the service from here has seen some improvements (notably with the introduction of evening weekday trains for the first time in more than twenty years).

Saturday services were suspended and replaced by buses until November 2018 due to the (significantly delayed) ongoing work to electrify the route through Bolton.

Services at the station were also temporarily suspended between 28 August and 11 September 2017 due to a damaged road bridge near the station.  A fractured water main caused part of the embankment and retaining wall supporting the bridge to collapse onto the track and damaged both the bridge supports and road surface.  The line was not in use at the time due to a planned engineering blockade at Bolton - this was due to end on 28 August (and was completed on schedule), but following the incident the railway remained closed between Bolton and  whilst repairs were carried out.  Replacement buses were in operation, with through trains diverted via alternative routes.  The line reopened on 6 September 2017, though trains were still unable to call at the station as repairs to the access road were still ongoing.  Normal working resumed five days later once these were completed.

There is no Sunday service. The lack of Sunday service was raised in Parliament in July 2019.

Electrification
Following delays caused by geological problems and change of main contractor, electric services eventually commenced on Monday 11 February 2019, utilising Class 319 electric multiple units.  None of these trains however stop here.

References

External links

Railway stations in the Metropolitan Borough of Bolton
DfT Category F2 stations
Former Lancashire and Yorkshire Railway stations
Railway stations in Great Britain opened in 1838
Northern franchise railway stations
Farnworth